Lebert Lombardo (February 11, 1905 – June 16, 1993) was a musician with the Royal Canadians and a younger brother of Guy Lombardo.

Biography
Lombardo was born in London, Ontario, Canada. He had three brothers who also became musicians: Guy, Carmen, and Victor.

With his brother Carmen, Lebert Lombardo was a member of the original Royal Canadians, playing trumpet, cornet, and drums.

On June 14, 1937, Lombardo married Helen Healey in New York City.  Earlier, he had been married to Carol Williams, who died due to an illness. She and Lombardo had been victims of a theft in 1930.

References

External links
 Lebert Lombardo at Social Security Death Index
 
 Lebert Lombardo recordings at the Discography of American Historical Recordings.

1905 births
1993 deaths
Canadian people of Italian descent
Canadian emigrants to the United States
Musicians from London, Ontario
20th-century Canadian male singers
20th-century trumpeters